In mathematics, in particular in nonlinear analysis, a Fréchet manifold is a topological space modeled on a Fréchet space in much the same way as a manifold is modeled on a Euclidean space.

More precisely, a Fréchet manifold consists of a Hausdorff space  with an atlas of coordinate charts over Fréchet spaces whose transitions are smooth mappings.  Thus  has an open cover  and a collection of homeomorphisms  onto their images, where  are Fréchet spaces, such that 
 is smooth for all pairs of indices

Classification up to homeomorphism 

A 1969 theorem of David Henderson states that every infinite-dimensional, separable, metric Fréchet manifold  can be embedded as an open subset of the infinite-dimensional, separable Hilbert space,  (up to linear isomorphism, there is only one such space).

The embedding homeomorphism can be used as a global chart for   Thus, in the infinite-dimensional, separable, metric case, up to homeomorphism, the "only" topological Fréchet manifolds are the open subsets of the separable infinite-dimensional Hilbert space.

See also 

 , of which a Fréchet manifold is a generalization

References 

  
  

Generalized manifolds
Manifolds
Nonlinear functional analysis
Structures on manifolds